Beth Medrash Govoha (Sephardi pronunciation: Bet Midrash Gavo'a. lit: "High House of Learning"; also known as Lakewood Yeshiva or BMG) is a Haredi Jewish Lithuanian yeshiva in Lakewood Township, New Jersey. It was founded by Rabbi Aaron Kotler in 1943 and is the second-largest yeshiva in the world, after Mir Yeshiva in Jerusalem. As of 2019, it had 6,715 students, 2,748 regular and 3,967 in Kollel status. The principal Rosh yeshiva since 1982 is Rabbi Malkiel Kotler. Talmud and halakha studies in the institution are carried in the form of over 200 small groups, Chaburos, which consist of several students mentored by a veteran, each pursuing its own specific curriculum with an emphasis on individual learning.

History 

Beth Medrash Govoha is a successor institution to Yeshivas Etz Chaim, which was located in Slutzk, in what is today Belarus. That institution was led by Rabbi Isser Zalman Meltzer and by Rabbi Aaron Kotler, until it was forcibly closed by the Soviet Revolution of 1917, which banned all forms of Jewish studies. Etz Chaim was reestablished in Kletzk, under then Polish rule by Rabbi Aaron Kotler, where it thrived until World War II and the destruction of much of European Jewry. Rabbi Kotler escaped the Nazis in 1941 and came to the United States where he opened BMG in 1943.

Description 
BMG's four campuses are located on 35 acres in Lakewood, with four campuses and numerous academic facilities, libraries and residence halls.

The newest building was completed in the summer of 2015, on the land where Bais Eliyahu (the "trailers") used to be. It was first used on Rosh Hashanah 5776, seating over one thousand people for the services. The building was sponsored by Ralph Herzka and Meir Levine.

The yeshiva is licensed by the New Jersey Commission on Higher Education and accredited by the Association of Advanced Rabbinical and Talmudic Schools.  It is authorized to grant bachelor's and master's degrees in Talmudics, as well as two post-master's diplomas in Talmudics.   What students seek in Beth Medrash Govoha is to at first attain the skills necessary to properly understand and analyze the Talmud and to be able to do independent research on a scholarly level, and then use these skills to become accomplished Talmudic scholars.

Beth Medrash Govoha is a postgraduate institution and the general age of entry for new students is about 22. A high level of analytic skill and comprehension in understanding the Talmud is required, to the extent that a student is able to study a subject from the starting point all the way to the most complex areas of that subject on his own. The yeshiva does not have a remedial program for weak or unprepared students, and reaching the level required to be a successful student at the yeshiva takes several years of intense, full-time study. As such, in general, only students who have already studied in an undergraduate level yeshiva geared for students aged 18–22, will be accepted.

Curriculum 

The yeshiva studies are based on classical Torah study traditions using the Talmud, Rishonim, Shulchan Aruch, Responsa, and Rabbinic literature as texts and sources.

Subjects 
Although all students study the Talmud regardless of whether they just joined the yeshiva or have already been studying for well over a decade, when students first arrive they study the mesechta (Talmudic tractate) that the yeshiva has officially selected to study at that time. This mesechta will always be one of eight that deal with areas of civil law.
Some students will continue learning these subjects for many years, developing great expertise in these areas, while others will study other areas of the Talmud. Some students focus primarily on the practical application of the talmudic laws based on the Halachic conclusions of the Shulchan Aruch. Because of the large number of students in the Yeshiva there are groups studying virtually every subject in the Talmud. Beth Medrash Govoha is unique among Yeshivas in that a student can study any subject in the Talmud or Halachah that he prefers.

Schedule 
The daily schedule consists of three  (study sessions) – a morning session, an afternoon session, and an evening session, in which a total of 10 hours of each day is spent studying. The morning session is the most important of the sessions and is the subject that students will devote their after-hours time to and are most likely to write papers on; it is also the subject of the lectures.

Chaburah system 

All learning is done within a system of chaburos (study groups) in which 15 to 200 scholars are seated together to study the same subject at the same pace with their individual chavrusa (study partner). Additionally some  assist in pairing the members of their  with an appropriate  (study partner). Most roshei chaburah will study the material on their own time so that they are proficient and thoroughly knowledgeable on the subject. Some  (plural of ) also give a weekly discourse on the topic that was studied that week. Many of the  require members themselves to prepare and give discourses of their own on a rotating basis. Other responsibilities of the  include submitting the number of seats needed for the members of his , and to decide the topic of study for the semester.

Programs, testing and acceptance

Semesters/Zmanim 
Three  (semesters)  exist in a year, based on the Hebrew calendar:
Winter , which is from Rosh Chodesh Cheshvan through the seventh of Nisan.
Summer  from Rosh Chodesh Iyar through the tenth of Av.
Elul  from Rosh Chodesh Elul through the eleventh of Tishrei.

The three  span two official semesters. The Fall semester runs through the Winter zman. The Spring semester includes the Summer zman and Elul zman.

Application 
Applications to enroll into the yeshiva are accepted twice a year, before the summer and winter semesters.  There are no enrollments for the fall semester. The deadlines vary, and they are generally close to the 1st of Elul for the winter enrollment, and the 1st of Adar for summer enrollment.

Testing and acceptance 
This is generally a four-part process. Only applicants who have received a " (entrance exam) card" authorizing them to advance will be able to proceed with these steps:

 The applicant completes a secondary registration application which asks for additional, detailed information that was not required on the original application.
The admissions officer holds a general interview with the applicant. With him are usually one or two other members of the faculty. The meeting will usually be short, allowing the admissions department an opportunity to evaluate the candidate's general potential for success in the institute.
A faculty member tests the candidate in general Talmudic knowledge. A grade is issued, on a scale of one to five, reflecting the applicant's possession of the requisite knowledge.
One of the four roshei yeshiva (deans) listens to a Pilpul, or talmudic discourse, from the applicant. This part of the exam is to test the applicant's ability to engage in specialized Talmudic reasoning called . Here too, a grade is issued on a scale of one to five.
 After completing the two exams acceptance will depend on a combination of all the factors in the admissions process. Usually applicants are notified during Chol HaMoed about the decision. If the applicant is accepted, he and his parents are then required to set up a meeting with the tuition department to discuss tuition arrangements. However it is the policy of the yeshiva that no eligible student be denied the opportunity to study Torah because of an inability to pay tuition.

Alumni Program 

, the  program, is a highly acclaimed weekly Sunday program for laymen. The  was created by Rav Yaakov Tescher.

Registration 
After acceptance, tuition is negotiated.  The stated policy of the yeshiva is that no eligible student is denied the opportunity to study Torah because of their inability to pay tuition. The accepted student must also complete steps required by the State of New Jersey of all students entering dormitories and post-secondary schools in New Jersey.
Additionally, in a signed acceptance agreement, the matriculating student agrees to abide by the rules of the institution.

Tumult day 

By long-standing institutional tradition, each semester begins with the majority of students exploring the many study groups (called "Chaburos") available in each field of study and choosing the one that they find of greatest interest. They then pair up with a study partner, who will join them in their study group.  As the first days back on campus for returning students, and the first ever day for new students, the atmosphere can seem tumultuous, with much milling about, good spirit and cheer, hence that day has become known as "Tumult day," during which little study takes place and instead much socializing along with the more serious work of choosing both study group and study partner.

Leadership 
Rabbi Aharon Kotler served as the academic and spiritual leader of the institution, from 1943 until his passing in 1962. He was succeeded by Rabbi Shneur Kotler, then 44 years old, who died in 1982. Today, Rabbi Malkiel Kotler, Rabbi Shneur's son,  and Rabbis Yerucham Olshin, Dovid Schustal, and Yisroel Neuman, serve in that role. Rabbi Aaron Kotler, a grandson of Rabbi Aharon Kotler, was President and CEO of the institution until he retired towards the end  of 2021.

Rabbi Nosson Meir Wachtfogel served as Dean of Students (mashgiach ruchani) from the mid 1950s until his death in 1998, he is succeeded by Rabbi Matisyohu Salomon and Rabbi Abba Brudny. Other mashgichim in the yeshiva included/include Rabbi Yehuda Jacobs, Rabbi Aharon Schustal, and Rabbi Eliezer Stefansky, and Rabbi Yaakov Pollack.

Notable alumni 
 Yitzchak Abadi, rabbi, posek, rosh kollel
 Philip Berg American rabbi
 Shlomo Carlebach, Musician
 José Faur, Rabbi
 Shraga Feivish Hager, Kosover Rebbe
 Moshe Hirsch, Head of a Neturei Karta group, Israel
 Moshe Hillel Hirsch, Rosh Yeshiva, Slabodka yeshiva, Bnai Brak, Israel
 Yehudah Jacobs (c. 1940–2020), rabbi and mashgiach ruchani in Beth Medrash Govoha
 Shmuel Kamenetsky rosh yeshiva, Talmudical Yeshiva of Philadelphia
 Yosef Yitzchok Lerner, rabbinical ordinator
 Uri Mayerfeld, rosh yeshiva, Yeshivas Ner Yisroel, Toronto
 Shlomo Miller, rosh kollel, Kollel Avreichim Institute for Advanced Talmud Study, Toronto
 Yaakov Pearlman, Chief Rabbi of Ireland
 Yechiel Perr, rosh yeshiva, Yeshiva of Far Rockaway
 Aaron Rakeffet-Rothkoff, Rabbi
 Ezra Schochet, rosh yeshiva, Yeshiva Ohr Elchonon Chabad/West Coast Talmudical Seminary, Los Angeles
 Dov Schwartzman, rosh yeshiva, Talmudical Yeshiva of Philadelphia and Yeshivas Bais Hatalmud, Jerusalem
 Meir Stern, Rabbi
 Elya Svei, rosh yeshiva, Talmudical Yeshiva of Philadelphia
 Yisroel Taplin, Talmudic scholar and author
 Hillel Zaks, Rosh Yeshiva Chevron and Knesset Hagedola, Israel
 Aharon Pfeuffer, Rosh Yeshiva in London and Johannesburg, known for his works on Kashrut
 Eliezer Gordon, former Rosh Yeshiva of Yeshiva of Monroe, NJ; today Rosh Yeshiva of Ber Hatalmud, Lakewood, NJ
 Avraham Dov Owsianka, former Rosh Yeshiva of Yeshiva of Monroe, NJ; today Rosh Yeshiva of Beis Medrash L'Talmud, Lakewood, NJ

See also 
 Lakewood East, an institution in Israel that is loosely affiliated with BMG
 Talmudical Yeshiva of Philadelphia

References 

 
Educational institutions established in 1943
Haredi Judaism in New Jersey
Haredi yeshivas
Kollelim
Men's universities and colleges in the United States
Orthodox yeshivas in New Jersey
Universities and colleges in Ocean County, New Jersey
Lakewood Township, New Jersey
1943 establishments in New Jersey